Brigadier Gerald Ernest Thubron DSO OBE (13 July 1903 – 6 September 1992) was an officer in the British Army.

Biography
Born the son of Olympic boatsman Emile Thubron in London, Gerald Thubron was educated at Lancing College and the Royal Military College, Sandhurst and was given a commission in the North Staffordshire Regiment in 1924.

In 1942 he fought with the First British Infantry Division in the Tunisian campaign and in January 1944 was General Staff Officer of the division which spearheaded the Allied landing at Anzio. He was awarded an OBE in 1944, followed by a DSO in 1945 as commander of the North Staffordshires in the ensuing Italian campaign, and by the end of the war had been promoted Brigade commander. After the war he served as Commandant of the Senior Officers' School for two years and was then Senior Army Liaison Officer in Canada. He retired as Deputy Director of Military Training at the War Office in 1956.

He was given the colonelcy of the North Staffordshires in 1958 until the amalgamation with the South Staffordshire Regiment in 1959. He returned in 1961 to serve as Colonel of the resultant Staffordshire Regiment until 1966.

He died in Piltdown, East Sussex in 1992. He had married Eve Dryden and had two children; his son is the writer Colin Thubron.

References

External links
Generals of World War II

1903 births
1992 deaths
British Army brigadiers of World War II
Companions of the Distinguished Service Order
Graduates of the Royal Military College, Sandhurst
North Staffordshire Regiment officers
Officers of the Order of the British Empire
People educated at Lancing College
Military personnel from London
Staffordshire Regiment officers
Commandants of the Senior Officers' School, Sheerness